Encore!  is an American reality streaming television series hosted and executive produced by Kristen Bell and Will Gluck. Based on a pilot special aired on ABC on December 10, 2017, the series premiered on Disney+ on November 12, 2019.

Premise
Encore! reunites the cast members of high school musicals to recreate their performance years after they originally performed.

Production

Development 
A television special, also titled Encore! and hosted by Bell, aired on ABC on December 10, 2017. It reunited the cast of a 1997 South Hills High School production of Into the Woods to recreate their original performance.

In April 2019, Disney+ ordered a series based on the special, to be hosted and executive produced by Kristen Bell.

When asked during the COVID-19 pandemic about the future of the series, creator Jason Cohen said, "Obviously, things right now are a little bit funky, with the coronavirus, and things have been thrown into flux a bit. But we are hoping we can do more."

Episodes

Special (2017)

Season 1 (2019–20)

Release
Encore! debuted on November 12, 2019, on the streaming service Disney+ in 4K HDR. Episodes were released weekly rather than all at once.

Marketing
A first trailer of the show was released on August 23, 2019, at the Disney+ Panel at D23 Expo 2019.

Reception

Critical reception 
The review aggregator website Rotten Tomatoes reported a 68% approval rating for the first season with an average rating of 6.75/10, based on 16 reviews. The website's critical consensus reads, "While it often feels more like a dress rehearsal, Encore! has just enough charm to keep theater lovers in their seats–though everyone else may duck out at intermission". Metacritic, which uses a weighted average, assigned a score of 63 out of 100 based on 12 critics, indicating "generally favorable reviews".

Lorraine Ali of Los Angeles Times praised the concept of Encore! and called it original, found the series humorous across the goofs and the dialogues of the performers, and claimed that the stories and emotions provided by the cast members manage to add depth to the show. Joyce Slaton of Common Sense Media rated the series 4 out of 5 stars, praised the depiction of positives messages, such as perseverance and teamwork, while complimenting the presence of role models, citing their honesty and emotional take with their stories. Gretchen Smail of IGN gave a 6 out of 10 rating, stated that the series provides a feeling of nostalgia through the performers reconnecting with their past, but found that the format of the show does not allow the cast members to come with a story sufficiently developed about themselves.

Accolades

References

External links 

 
 

2010s American documentary television series
2019 American television series debuts
English-language television shows
National Geographic (American TV channel) original programming
Disney+ original programming
Television series by Disney